The Schönbühlhorn (3,854 m) is a mountain in the Bernese Alps, overlooking the Aletsch Glacier in the canton of Valais. It lies on the range south of the Grünhornlücke, that culminates at the Gross Wannenhorn.

References

External links
Schönbühlhorn on Hikr

Mountains of the Alps
Alpine three-thousanders
Mountains of Switzerland
Bernese Alps
Mountains of Valais
Three-thousanders of Switzerland